Joystiq was a video gaming blog founded in June 2004 as part of the Weblogs, Inc. family of weblogs, now owned by AOL. It was AOL's primary video game blog, with sister blogs dealing with MMORPG gaming in general and the popular MMORPG World of Warcraft in particular.

After declining readership, it was announced that Joystiq would be shut down on February 3, 2015, as part of moves to downsize AOL's operations by shuttering its "underperforming" properties.

History

Predecessors
As of early 2004, Weblogs, Inc. was seeking to add a blog to its repertoire for the sole purpose of covering news related to video games, as evidenced by the now-defunct The Video Games Weblog, founded February 27, 2004. On March 12, Weblogs, Inc. CEO Jason Calacanis announced two spinoff projects: The Unofficial Playstation 3 Weblog and The Unofficial Xbox 2, both of which are now similarly retired, though they would set a precedent for the launching of Joystiq's Fanboy blogs in 2005. However, none of these three initial weblogs were ever aggressively marketed, and The Video Games Weblog made its final post on May 18, 2005, amassing 175 blog entries in total (a rather scant amount by Weblogs, Inc. standards). All three blogs are now listed as "On Hiatus/Retired" in the Weblogs, Inc. directory. David Touve, the primary contributor to these early blogs, would later act as Joystiqs features editor for a short time in late 2005 before resigning due to the birth of his child.

Formation
Later that year, following 2004's Electronic Entertainment Expo (E3), Peter Rojas, the founder of and lead contributor to the company's flagship blog Engadget, formally introduced Joystiq to the masses, positioning the blog as an extension to Engadget's Gaming subdomain. However, being a separate and wholly video game-related entity, Joystiq allowed for much more in-depth analysis of the video game industry than the primarily consumer electronics-oriented Engadget. While Joystiq had featured content as early as April 2, the blog is not officially considered to have been launched until Rojas's public revelation on Engadget on Wednesday, June 16, 2004.

Changes in site format
The first major shakeup in Joystiqs history occurred in June 2005, when senior editor Ben Zackheim, after being offered a position at America Online's Games division, announced his resignation due to a conflict of interest. He was succeeded by Vladimir Cole, a blogger who had been hired February 2005 and who held the position of Editor-in-Chief until February 2007, when Christopher Grant took over after Cole took a job with Microsoft's Xbox division. Weblogs, Inc. was acquired in October 2005 by America Online.

On November 21, 2005, coinciding with the North American launch of the Xbox 360, Joystiq welcomed its first spinoff project: Xbox 360 Fanboy, a blog devoted solely to the in-depth coverage of its namesake hardware. For the next three weeks this trend would continue, with PSP Fanboy launching on November 28, WoW Insider on December 6, and DS Fanboy on December 12. On February 15, 2006, a sixth blog was introduced: Revolution Fanboy, (which was later renamed to Nintendo Wii Fanboy), while March 29 heralded the arrival of PS3 Fanboy, completing Joystiqs trifecta of specialized next-gen coverage. While some have criticized the practice of splintering off Joystiqs primary areas of expertise as nothing more than a thinly veiled bid to increase traffic, Jason Calacanis has justified these actions by asserting that as Joystiq grows so too does its potential audience, and thus separate blogs are necessary to fulfill these specialized niches.

On January 26, 2006, Joystiq coined the phrase "DS phat", a nickname for the old-style Nintendo DS that helps differentiate between the old DS and the DS Lite.

On November 2, 2007, Massively was launched to cover MMOs in general.

On January 27, 2009, the Fanboy sites were rebranded and integrated directly into the main Joystiq site.  DS and Wii Fanboy were merged into Joystiq Nintendo, as were PSP and PS3 Fanboy merged into Joystiq PlayStation, and Xbox 360 Fanboy became Joystiq Xbox. Until 2010, these sites continued to feature specialized posts in addition to relevant content from the main Joystiq site.

On June 11, 2010, as part of the new "Futurestiq" iteration of the site, the three platform-specific sites shut down, with staff folded into Joystiq full-time.

In January 2012, Ludwig Kietzmann became the editor-in-chief after Grant left to form a new video game news website with Vox Media, owners of The Verge, known as Polygon.

Shutdown 
In January 2015, co-owned blog TechCrunch reported that AOL was planning to shutter underperforming content properties, particularly in the technology and lifestyle verticals, to focus on its stronger properties, video, and advertising sales. On January 27, 2015, Re/code reported that Joystiq was among the sites that were "likely" to be shut down as part of this restructuring plan. Readership of Joystiq had seen sharp declines, falling by at least 18% over the previous year.

On January 30, 2015, various Joystiq staff members, and eventually the site itself, confirmed that the site, along with its spin-offs Massively and WoW Insider, and fellow AOL property TUAW, would cease operations after February 3, 2015. Gaming-oriented coverage was assumed by Engadget. After the shutdown, on February 10, 2015, the staff of Massively launched a successor site, Massively Overpowered, dedicated to the continuation of their MMO coverage.

Editors
The Joystiq staff before the closure included editor-in-chief Ludwig Kietzmann, managing editor Susan Arendt, feature content director Xav de Matos, reviews content director Richard Mitchell, news content director Alexander Sliwinski, senior reporter Jess Conditt, and contributing editors Sinan Kubba, Danny Cowan, Mike Suszek and Earnest Cavalli. Thomas Schulenberg and Sam Prell maintained the blog on the weekends as the weekend editors and Anthony John Agnello served as community manager.

Previous Joystiq staff members include editor-in-chief Chris Grant, managing editor James Ransom-Wiley, features editor Kevin Kelly, reviews editor Justin McElroy, editors Griffin McElroy, J.C. Fletcher, and Mike Schramm, East Coast Editor Andrew Yoon, and West Coast Editor Randy Nelson.

Podcast

The original format for the Joystiq Podcast was hosted by Chris Grant, Ludwig Kietzmann and Justin McElroy. The three would discuss various gaming-related news stories. Segments included, 'What Have you Been Playing?', 'Brush With Fame', 'The Big Three', 'The Do It Line!' and 'Reader Mail'. Various podcasts have included guests from other gaming websites such as CheapyD, Chris Remo, and Stephen Totilo.

The first episode of the subsequent Joystiq Show, posted on June 17, 2011, promised a more serious, academic format, with a multifaceted examination of Duke Nukem Forever including an interview with voice actor Jon St. John and a review roundtable. Over time, the show's format evolved to include more off-the-cuff discussion, while maintaining the topical nature.

The latest iteration of the podcast, the Super Joystiq Podcast, was announced at Joystiqs PAX East 2012 panel and officially released on May 4, 2012. This podcast features every editor, grouped together in a different configuration every week, each participating in an intro, news, preview, or "Joystiq Research Institute" segment.

Awards
While Joystiq has been nominated for several awards in the category of technology-related weblogs, it has consistently been overshadowed in this regard by blogs representing a far wider spectrum of technology, including Slashdot, Gizmodo, and its ubiquitous sibling Engadget. Joystiq has, however, been included in a number of listings of outstanding weblogs, including Forbes.com's Best of the Web and the Feedster 500.

See also
GameDaily

References

External links
Joystiq website (Wayback Machine copy)

Video game blogs
Weblogs, Inc.
American gaming websites
Internet properties established in 2004
Internet properties disestablished in 2015
Defunct American websites
Video game news websites